The Anchor Line was a steamboat company that operated a fleet of boats on the Mississippi River between St. Louis, Missouri, and New Orleans, Louisiana, between 1859 and 1898, when it went out of business. It was one of the most well-known, if not successful, pools of steamboats formed on the lower Mississippi River in the decades following the American Civil War.

History

Early years, 1859-1879 

The company was founded in 1859 as the Memphis and St. Louis Packet Line, principally providing service to these two cities and points in between. Two years later, the American Civil War broke out. Whereas many steamboat owners were forced to cease operations at the outbreak of hostilities, the Memphis and St. Louis Packet Line managed to remain in business by operating on the parts of the Mississippi River occupied by the Union forces. By the spring of 1862, this included all parts of the river as far south as Memphis. One year later, all ports on the river except for Vicksburg, Mississippi, and Port Hudson, Louisiana, were under Federal control. On 4 July 1863, Union forces under Ulysses S. Grant forced the Confederate garrison commanded by John C. Pemberton to surrender Vicksburg, and the next day, Port Hudson surrendered, opening the river to commercial steamboat traffic.

In 1874, the company adopted the giant anchor as its symbol (and presumably changed its name at that date). In any case, by the mid-1870s it was known as the "Anchor Line." The anchor was prominently hung between the two tall smokestacks on each of its boats. It was also included as a logo on the furnishings of many of its boats, including the chairs manufactured for the boats' cabins.

The golden era, 1880-1894 

By the early 1880s, the company had acquired sufficient capital to justify the building of several new steamboats. Almost all of these boats were built by the Howard Shipbuilding Company of Jeffersonville, Indiana. The Anchor Line spared no expense on the building of these boats, which became veritable floating palaces of the late American Victorian era. Between 1880 and 1887, the Anchor Line built no fewer than ten of these extravagant steamboats, which averaged each about 275 feet (83.33 m) in length from bow to stern and about 45 feet (13.64 m) in width. In contrast to the common practice of naming steamboats after people or after some pleasant-sounding idea, feeling, or animal, the Anchor Line chose to name these craft after cities along its route. The first of these to be built was the Belle Memphis, which, after it steamed out of St. Louis in early 1881 and first docked at Memphis, was presented by the city with a gift of a set of flags.

Most of these boats survived the common disasters that were known to plague Mississippi River steamboats at the time, such as fire, snags (large sticks or branches in the river bed that would often tear holes in boats' hulls), ice, grounding on sandbars, and so forth to remain in service with the Anchor Line from the day they were built until the company went out of business in 1898. One of them, the City of Providence, built for the Anchor Line in 1880, was sold when the Anchor Line was liquidated and was then operated by various excursion companies until it was finally destroyed by ice in January 1910, some twenty-nine years after it was first put into service.

Decline and collapse, 1894-1898

Problems of the River itself 
The Mississippi River proved throughout the nineteenth century to be a volatile and sometimes hazardous or unnavigable road for boat traffic. Despite the best efforts of the U.S. Army Corps of Engineers, high water would swallow landings, making many smaller stops unavailable for steamboats. Likewise, low water would strand these towns far from any suitable site for boats to land (or, conversely, strand steamboats at landings in water with no outlet to a navigable channel), and increase the possibility that hazards such as snags would pierce steamboats' hulls. Floods, such as the great Flood of 1892 (during which all of Concordia Parish, Louisiana, was said to be underwater), could destroy crops that would comprise a sizable portion of the cargo transported by steamboats such as those of the Anchor Line, thus also cutting off a sizable portion of the steamboats' business. The early 1890s, particularly 1892 and 1894, seem to have been years where conditions on the river significantly affected the Anchor Line's business.

Competition from railroads 
Added to the problems inherent with river traffic was the increasingly expanding railroad network in the United States, which soon came into direct competition with steamboats for business, both from passengers and from cargo. Rail travel was not subject to the dictates of the river's course (tracks could be laid on ground virtually anywhere in the Mississippi valley), servicing directly more towns than any steamboat could. Trains were generally safer than steamboats, as well, being not prone to snags, sandbars, ice, or other problems particular to river travel. Finally, trains were faster, as they generally traveled much quicker than the 15 mph (24.3 km/h) averaged by late-nineteenth-century Anchor Line boats.

The 1896 tornado 

Historians say that the Anchor Line was ultimately doomed by the 1896 St. Louis–East St. Louis tornado that struck on May 27. The tornado touched down in the core of St. Louis and swept eastward across the river into East St. Louis, Illinois. The resulting death toll was a confirmed 255 people, though estimates put the number at close to 400. This is in part because the Anchor Line's floating palaces (as well as other steamboats) stationed at the St. Louis landing lay directly in the tornado's path. The Anchor Line's boats the Arkansas City and the City of Cairo were completely destroyed, and the City of Monroe was badly damaged.

Later that year the company launched another boat, the Bluff City. In 1897, the Anchor Line repaired, extended, and installed electric lights on the City of Monroe, renaming it the Hill City. It issued a 22-page brochure, titled A Romantic Trip to the Sunny South, in an attempt to lure passengers.  Nonetheless, that same year the Bluff City was destroyed by fire, the Belle Memphis was irreparably damaged by a snag, and the City of Hickman, sank.

The disasters ultimately proved too costly for the Anchor Line to weather, and in 1898 it sold off its remaining boats and ceased operations.

Route 

The Anchor Line served most cities between St. Louis and New Orleans, as well as many smaller landings on occasion or by special request of passengers. Not all Anchor Line steamboats traveled this entire route regularly; for example, between 1888 and 1896, the Arkansas City worked a route between St. Louis and Natchez.

Main landings probably included:
 Cairo, Illinois
 New Madrid, Missouri
 Hickman, Kentucky
 Memphis
 Helena, Arkansas
 Greenville, Mississippi
 Vicksburg
 Natchez, Mississippi (and Vidalia, Louisiana, across the river)
 Bayou Sara, Louisiana
 Baton Rouge, Louisiana
 Donaldsonville, Louisiana
 New Orleans

Boats 
Beginning in 1880, all newly built Anchor Line Boats were side-wheelers, meaning they each had two large paddlewheels located on the starboard and port side of the boat, located about two-thirds of the way back from the prow. The lone exception was the Bluff City.

References 

 Gandy, Joan W. and Thomas H. The Mississippi Steamboat Era In Historic Photographs: Natchez to New Orleans, 1870-1920. New York: Dover Publications, 1987.
 Way, Frederick Jr. Way's Packet Directory, 1848-1994: Passenger Steamboats of the Mississippi River System Since the Advent of Photography in Mid-Continent America, 2nd ed. Athens, OH: Ohio University Press, 1994.

Shipping companies of the United States
Mississippi River
Transport companies established in 1859
Transport companies disestablished in 1898
Economic history of the United States
Cultural history of the United States
Economy of St. Louis
Shipping in Greater St. Louis
History of St. Louis
Transportation in New Orleans
19th century in New Orleans
1896 natural disasters
Companies based in Memphis, Tennessee
Defunct companies based in Tennessee
1859 establishments in Tennessee
American companies established in 1859